Binnu Dhillon (born 29 August 1975) is an Indian actor who is known for his roles in Punjabi cinema and Hindi films .

Early life and education
Dhillon was born on 29 August 1975 in Dhuri, Sangrur, Punjab, where he did his schooling from Guru Teg Bahadur Public School. He did his post-graduate degree in theatre and television from Punjabi University, Patiala.

Career
Binnu Dhillon began his career as a Bhangra performer and had an opportunity to perform at the Indian Festivals in Germany and the UK, he appeared in television and serials before he entered the acting field. He continued to act in plays during his time in university such as a student and as part of the theatre and television department's repertory too.

He made his debut on television with the serial Paddu, written and directed by Gurbir Singh Grewal in 1998 and went on to work in popular television serials Sarhad, Lori, Gaoundi Dharti, Sirnaave, Man Jeetey Jag Jeet, Channo Chan Vargi, Professor Money Plant, Jugnu Hazir Hai, Jugnu Mast Mast, Padam Paria, Kankaal, Aaste and Pagdandian. He continued to perform in Tele Films: Khara Dudh and Khich Ghuggi Khich.

He also played small roles in commercially successful Hindi films like Shaheed-E-Azam and Dev D.
Binnu has also done some acts with comedian Bhagwant Maan.

In 2010, he directed a play Naughty Baba in Town that was performed in both US and Canada. Binnu is now one of the most known comedian of Punjabi movies.

Binnu Dhillon rose on the Punjabi comedy scene with films like Carry On Jatta, Sirphire, Raula Pai Gaya, Tu Mera 22 Main Tera 22, Lucky Di Unlucky Story, Rangeelay and Vekh Baraatan Challiyan.

Filmography

References

External links
 
 

1975 births
Living people
Indian male comedians
People from Sangrur
Punjabi people
21st-century Indian male actors
Male actors from Punjab, India
Indian male voice actors
People from Patiala